The 2015–16 Holstein Kiel season is the 116th season in the football club's history and 3rd consecutive and 4th overall season in the third tier of German football, the 3. Liga, having been promoted from the Regionalliga Nord in 2013. In addition to the 3. Liga, will also participate in this season's edition of the DFB-Pokal, and the Schleswig-Holstein Cup, part of the Verbandspokal. This will be the 105th season for the club in the Holstein-Stadion, located in Kiel, Germany. The stadium has a capacity of 11,386 seats, which can be expanded to 15,000 seats.

Background
In the club's previous season in the 3. Liga, they finished in 3rd place, qualifying to the promotion playoffs where they faced TSV 1860 München. They lost 1–2 on aggregate after 1860 München scored two late goals, with one in stoppage time. After losing on aggregate, they remained in the 3. Liga. In the Schleswig-Holstein Cup, they made it to the final, which was never played. This was because Holstein Kiel already qualified for the DFB-Pokal through league position, meaning their opponents VfB Lübeck would qualify no matter what. In the previous season's edition of the DFB-Pokal, they went out in Round 1 after losing to TSV 1860 München 1–2.

Squad

On loan

Transfers

In

Out

Technical staff

Friendlies

Competitions

Overall

Overview

3. Liga

League table

Results summary

Results by round

Matches

DFB-Pokal

Schleswig-Holstein Cup

References

Holstein Kiel
Holstein Kiel seasons